The nationality law of Bangladesh governs the issues of citizenship and nationality of the People's Republic of Bangladesh. The law regulates the nationality and citizenship status of all people who live in Bangladesh as well as all people who are of Bangladeshi descent. It allows the children of expatriates, foreigners as well as residents in Bangladesh to examine their citizenship status and if necessary, apply for and obtain citizenship of Bangladesh.

The primary law relating to Bangladesh citizenship is The Citizenship Act, 1951, originally the Pakistan Citizenship Act 1951, later amended by a number of legislative orders introduced by the Government of Bangladesh.

Citizenship

Upon the founding of the state
The territory that is modern day Bangladesh was a part of Pakistan called East Pakistan before 1971. Previously Pakistan, East Pakistan (modern day Bangladesh), and India had been part of British India until independence from Britain and the partition of India and Pakistan into two separate countries in 1947. Before the advent of Bangladeshi nationality law, Pakistani nationality law and British nationality law would have applied.

Upon the founding of the state, Bangladesh law granted citizenship to persons who were permanent residents of the territories that became Bangladesh on 25 March 1971. The wording of the order makes separate mention of those whose father or grandfather were born in the territory and others, but it is unclear that there is any distinction in law between those groups. The law also describes Bengalis who were in West Pakistan during the 1971 war and facing obstacles over returning as permanent residents eligible for Bangladeshi citizenship.

Jus sanguinis 
According to the Citizenship Act 1951, one method of acquiring Bangladeshi nationality is via jus sanguinis (Citizenship by right of blood). This means one may acquire citizenship regardless of whether they were born on Bangladeshi sovereign territory or not. Bangladeshi citizenship is provided primarily jus sanguinis, or through bloodline, irrespective of the place or the legitimacy of the birth. Therefore, any child born to a Bangladeshi woman illegitimately outside Bangladeshi soil would still be a Bangladeshi citizen, whereas a child born to two non-nationals in Bangladesh would not. This method is restricted if the child's parents also acquired their nationality through naturalisation or by descent.

Note, however that the Act states that for this to be the case, if the parent from whom the citizenship is to be inherited obtained their Bangladeshi citizenship by descent (rather than birth, for example) then the birth must be registered at the nearest Bangladeshi Embassy or Mission.

Jus soli 
Citizenship is acquired jus soli (Citizenship by right of birth within the territory), or at birth, when the identity or nationality of the parents is unknown. In this regard, the child is assumed to be born to Bangladeshi nationals, and hence, given citizenship upon birth. However, this does not apply to the children of enemy aliens born in Bangladesh and it also does not apply to people residing illegally in Bangladesh or refugees in Bangladesh. Enemy aliens are people who do not recognize or refuse to recognize the sovereignty, territorial integrity and independence of the People's Republic of Bangladesh. Enemy aliens are also people whose country of citizenship is, or was, at war with Bangladesh since the declaration of independence in March 1971 by the father of the nation Sheikh Mujibur Rahman. Jus soli citizenship is conferred upon some Urdu-speaking people of Bangladesh since May 2008 by a High Court verdict (see below).

Naturalization 
Naturalization is permitted by the Citizenship Law of Bangladesh. Any adult of good character who is married to a Bangladeshi and residing legally in Bangladesh for a period of five years; competent in Bengali language; and intending to reside in Bangladesh can apply for naturalisation. Naturalization may be conferred categorically or without certain rights or privileges, such as the right to stand in parliamentary elections as a candidate. It is also conferred at the discretion of the Government of Bangladesh. Any person who is a citizen of a nation where Bangladeshis are not allowed to naturalise (for instance, Saudi Arabia) is not eligible for naturalisation. Naturalization of a foreigner does not automatically extend to their foreign children. However, they may apply as soon as the naturalised person has taken the citizenship oath of allegiance.

If denied, a person can appeal against the decision within thirty days, where they will be heard. They cannot appeal if citizenship is conferred without certain rights or privileges. If accepted, a naturalised citizen must take an oath of allegiance within thirty days of the grant. A person is considered naturalised only after the oath.

Dual citizenship 
Dual citizenship is permitted under certain circumstances where the person is not a citizen of a SAARC country. Such dual citizens of Bangladesh can apply for a Dual Nationality Certificate which makes it legal to use a foreign passport however, people are not prosecuted for not applying for such certificate. It is also possible to enter Bangladesh as a person of Bangladeshi origin, or a spouse or child of a person of Bangladeshi origin via a No Visa Required (NVR) seal, stamp or sticker on their foreign passports. An eligible person can apply for the NVR stamp/sticker at any Bangladeshi mission overseas. NVR exceptions include citizens of SAARC countries.

Citizenship by investment 
People who invest in Bangladesh can acquire permanent residency status by investing a minimum of US$75,000 in non-repatriable funds. In addition to many other benefits, permanent residency allows a person to stay in Bangladesh for as long as they want, as well as enter and exit Bangladesh unlimited times without requiring a visa. Citizenship is available by investing a minimum of US$500,000 or by transferring US$1,000,000 in non-repatriable funds to any recognised financial institution in Bangladesh. Although the initial investment to obtain permanent residency or citizenship is non-repatriable, profits, dividends and salaries are repatriable overseas. Under its export oriented, private sector led growth strategy and liberal Industrial Policy, Bangladesh offers potential investors and entrepreneurs generous opportunities, tax exemptions and many other incentives for investment.

Honorary citizenship 
The government of Bangladesh reserves the right to grant honorary citizenship to foreign nationals who make exemplary contributions to society in Bangladesh or obtain outstanding achievements for Bangladesh, such as the honour conferred to Father Marino Rigon or Gordon Greenidge. Gordon Greenidge was appointed the head coach of the Bangladesh national cricket team in 1997. His guidance helped the Bangladesh men's cricket team win the 1997 ICC Trophy beating 22 other nations, which also ensured qualification to the 1999 ICC Cricket World Cup. Participation in their first ever cricket world cup changed Bangladesh cricket forever and lead to Test cricket status for the Bangladesh national cricket team in 2000. Gordon Greenidge was conferred honorary citizenship of Bangladesh by the Prime Minister, Sheikh Hasina, for these outstanding achievements of winning the 1997 ICC Trophy and simultaneously qualifying for the cricket world cup.

Travel freedom

As of 22 May 2018, Bangladeshi citizens had visa-free or visa on arrival access to 41 countries and territories, ranking the Bangladeshi passport 94th in the world according to the Visa Restrictions Index.

Relinquishing nationality 
Nationality can be revoked only if it was conferred upon a person by naturalisation, unless the person wilfully surrenders citizenship.

It can be revoked if the naturalised alien provided false information in his/her application. It can also be revoked if the person is sentenced to prison for at least a year or fined at least BDT 1,000 (about US$14) within five years of the naturalisation, or if the person loses contact with Bangladesh for at least seven years. Defection by trade and communication with an enemy at war or remaining a citizen of an enemy state at war will also result in denaturalisation.

Controversial issues

Ghulam Azam 
Ghulam Azam was a leader of Jamaat-e-Islami during the Liberation War of Bangladesh. He moved to Lahore, Pakistan, during the war, held a Pakistani passport, applying repeatedly for a Bangladeshi nationality until 1978, when he returned to Bangladesh on a tourist visa. He stayed in the same visa for 16 years until 1994. He then obtained Bangladeshi citizenship and a Bangladeshi passport during Khaleda Zia's tenure.

In a controversial verdict, the High Court, and later, the Supreme Court held that Ghulam Azam was a citizen by descent and domicile since the commencement of the Bangladesh Citizenship Order.

Stranded Pakistanis 
The independence of Bangladesh from Pakistan in 1971 led to the abandonment in the Bengali-majority state of around half a million "stranded Pakistanis", colloquially called Biharis, who traced their ethno-linguistic heritage mostly to the Bihar region. Biharis who maintained that they were Bangladeshis were granted citizenship by the Bangladesh Citizenship Order 1972.

Those who maintained that they were Pakistanis, however, were considered non-nationals, as well as those who found their names at the Red Cross list of refugees. Despite official promises, neither Pakistan nor Bangladesh recognised them as citizens until May 2008, when the High Court conferred jus soli citizenship to all Urdu-speaking people born and residing in Bangladeshi territory after 1971.

Rohingya people
Several hundred thousand Rohingya people fled Myanmar for Bangladesh including 250,000 in 1978 as a result of the King Dragon operation in Arakan. In an attempt to counter the Burmese claims that the Rohingyas are Bangladeshis, the Bangladesh Government amended the Citizenship Order in 1982 to officially declare all the Rohingya refugees non-nationals. The Rohingya refugees are unable to return to Myanmar in fear of the military junta.

See also
 Pakistani nationality law
 Bangladesh passport

References

External links
 Full Act at Legislative and Parliamentary Affairs Division, Ministry of Law, Justice and Parliamentary Affairs

Law of Bangladesh
Nationality law
Foreign relations of Bangladesh
Bangladesh and the Commonwealth of Nations